Taquan Air Flight 20 is a regularly scheduled commuter flight operated by Taquan Air from Ketchikan Harbor Seaplane Base to Metlakatla Seaplane Base. On 20 May 2019, the pilot lost control of the de Havilland Canada DHC-2 Beaver floatplane  while landing in the harbor at Metlakatla, Alaska, United States. The airplane overturned, destroying the aircraft and killing both persons aboard. The accident was attributed to challenging wind conditions that proved too difficult for the relatively inexperienced pilot to handle.

Aircraft 
The accident aircraft was a de Havilland Canada DHC-2 Beaver floatplane, FAA aircraft registration number N67667, serial number 1309, registered to Blue Aircraft, LLC and operated by Venture Travel, LLC, dba Taquan Air, Ketchikan, Alaska. The aircraft carried mail and freight bound for Metlakatla in addition to passengers.

Crash 
At about 3:56 PM local time, the aircraft initiated a landing in the Metlakatla harbor in a westerly direction. Two witnesses reported that as the aircraft descended, it rocked to the left, and then to the right. As it touched down, one witness reported that the right float "dug in" to the water, and another reported that the right wing struck the water. The aircraft nosed over and came to rest inverted with the passenger cabin submerged. Volunteers from the Metlakatla Volunteer Fire Department and the Ketchikan Volunteer Rescue Squad responded in rescue boats, and the crash was reported to the U.S. Coast Guard at 4:10 PM. First responders were able to hoist the aircraft partially out of the water by the empennage and extract the occupants, airplane seats, mail and packages. The crash tore away the right wing and wing strut; these components, along with the removed passenger seat, remained missing when the preliminary accident report was issued. Local volunteers subsequently towed the stricken aircraft to shore. The weather at the time of the crash was reportedly clear, with light winds and light chop, and winds from the southeast at 13-15 mph (21–24 km/h).

Passengers and crew 
The aircraft carried a single pilot and a single passenger, both of whom perished in the crash. The victims were identified the following day. The passenger was an epidemiologist who was commuting to an Alaska Native Tribal Health Consortium clinic in Metlakatla. The pilot was a seasonal hire and held a commercial pilot certificate with single-engine land, single-engine sea, and an instrument ratings. He had 1,606 hours of total flight time with 5 hours in float-equipped airplanes.

Investigation 
The National Transportation Safety Board (NTSB) immediately began an investigation of the accident. The NTSB also initiated a separate overall investigation of Taquan Air; the airline declined to comment.

Aftermath 

The accident occurred one week after the 2019 George Inlet, Alaska mid-air collision, another multiple-fatality air crash involving a Taquan flight, and the airline suspended all flights the day after this second crash. Amid increased oversight by the Federal Aviation Administration (FAA), Taquan resumed limited cargo service on 23 May, scheduled passenger flights on 31 May, and on-demand sightseeing tours on 3 June.

References

Aviation accidents and incidents in the United States in 2019
Accidents and incidents involving the de Havilland Canada DHC-2 Beaver
2019 in Alaska
May 2019 events in the United States
Aviation accidents and incidents in Alaska